Nuosu or Nosu (transcribed as ), also known as Northern Yi, Liangshan Yi, and Sichuan Yi, is the prestige language of the Yi people; it has been chosen by the Chinese government as the standard Yi language and, as such, is the only one taught in schools, both in its oral and written forms. It was spoken by two million people and was increasing as of (PRC census); 60% were monolingual (1994 estimate). 
Nuosu is the native Nuosu name for their own language and is not used in Mandarin Chinese, though it may sometimes be translated as Nuòsūyǔ.

The occasional terms "Black Yi" and 'White Yi' are castes of the Nuosu people, not dialects.

Nuosu is one of several often mutually unintelligible varieties known as Yi, Lolo, Moso, or Noso; the six Yi languages recognized by the Chinese government hold only 25% to 50% of their vocabulary in common. They share a common traditional writing system, though this is used for shamanism rather than daily accounting.

Distribution
Liangshan Yi (Nuosu) is mostly spoken in southern Sichuan (mainly Liangshan). In places of Suchuan in which there are only Nuosu speakers, it is also simply referred to as Yi, and the other Sichuanese Yi language is [[Nasu.

Northern Yi (Nuosu) in northern Yunnan is spoken mainly in the northern part of Yunnan, including Kunming and Chuxiong. It is also called Black Yi or White Yi.

In Vietnam, Nuosu (usually known as Northern Lô Lô) is spoken in Ha Giang Province and Lao Cai Province, and speakers are classified as Lô Lô people. No known is about of the number of Nuosu in Vietnam.

In Laos, Nuosu is spoken in Phongsaly Province in 3 villages near the Chinese border. Speakers are classified separately as Lolo.

In Myanmar, Nuosu is possibly spoken in Shan State or Kachin State, and it is usually known as Northeastern Yi or simply Yi, and speakers are classified as Lisu people which form the Kachin people.

In Thailand, Nuosu (usually referred to as Lolo), is spoken in Chiang Rai Province. Speakers are classified as Lolo subgroup of Lisu people. The Lolo of Thailand migrated from Myanmar.

Dialects

Lama (2012)
Lama (2012) gives the following classification for Nuosu dialects.
Nuosu
Qumusu (Tianba)
Nuosu proper
Nuosu
Muhisu
Nuosu
Yinuo
Shengzha
Niesu
Suondi
Adu

The Qumusu (曲木苏, Tianba 田坝) dialect is the most divergent one. The other dialects group as Niesu (聂苏,  and Adu) and as Nuosu proper (Muhisu 米西苏, Yinuo 义诺, and Shengzha 圣乍). Niesu has both lost voiceless nasals and developed diphthongs.

Adu (阿都话), characterized by its labial–velar consonants, is spoken in the Butuo and Ningnan counties of Liangshan Yi Autonomous Prefecture, Sichuan province, and also in parts of Puge, Zhaojue, Dechang, and Jinyang counties.

Nyisu or Yellow Yi (黄彝) of Fumin County, Yunnan may either be a Suondi Yi (Nuosu) dialect or Nisu dialect.

Zhu and Zhang (2005) reports that the Shuitian people reside mostly in the lowlands of the Anning River drainage basin, in Xichang, Xide, and Mianning counties of Liangshan Prefecture in Sichuan. They are called Muhisu (mu33 hi44 su33) by the neighboring Yi highland people. Shuitian is spoken in the following locations. Shuitian belongs to the Shengzha dialect of Northern Yi.

Mianning County: Jionglong 迥龙, Lugu 泸沽, Hebian 河边; Manshuiwan 漫水湾
Xichang: Lizhou 礼州, Yuehua 月华
Xide County: Mianshan 冕山镇 (including Shitoushan Village 石头山村), Lake 拉克

Bradley (1997)
According to Bradley (1997), there are three main dialects of Nosu, of which the Southeastern one (Sondi) is most divergent.
Northern
Tianba 田坝  Northwestern
Yinuo 义诺 a.k.a. Northeastern
Central (Shengzha 圣乍)
Southeastern (Sondi)
Sondi
Adur

Chen (2010)
Chen (2010) lists the following dialects of Nosu. Also listed are the counties where each respective dialect is spoken.

Nosu 诺苏方言
Senza, Shèngzhà 圣乍次方言
Senza, Shèngzhà 圣乍: 1,200,000 speakers primarily in Xide, Yuexi, Ganluo, Jinyang, Puge, Leibo, Xichang, Dechang, Mianning, Yanyuan, Yanbian, Muli, Shimian, Jiulong, and Luding; also in Huaping, Yongsheng, Ninglang, Lijiang, Jianchuan, Yongshan, and Qiaojia
Yino, Yìnuò 义诺: 600,000 speakers primarily in Meigu, Mabian, Leibo, and Ebian, Ganluo; also in Yuexi, Zhaojue, and Jinyang
Lidim, Tiánbà 田坝: 100,000 speakers primarily in Ganluo, Yuexi, and Ebian; also in Hanyuan
Sodi, Suǒdì 所地次方言: 600,000 speakers primarily in Tuoxian, Huili, Huidong, Ningnan, Miyi, Dechang, and Puge

Writing system

Classic Yi is a syllabic logographic system of 8,000–10,000 glyphs. Although similar to Chinese characters in function, the glyphs are independent in form, with little to suggest a direct relation.

In 1958 the Chinese government had introduced a Roman-based alphabet based on the romanized script of Gladstone Porteous of Sayingpan. This was later replaced by the Modern Yi script.

The Modern Yi script (   'Nosu script') is a standardized syllabary derived from the classic script in 1974. It was made the official script of the Yi languages in 1980. There are 756 basic glyphs based on the Liangshan dialect, plus 63 for syllables only found in Chinese borrowings. The government requires the use of the script for signs in some designated public places.

Phonology
The written equivalents of the phonemes listed here are "Yi Pinyin". For information about the actual script used see the section entitled "Writing System".

Consonants

Vowels

Nuosu has five pairs of phonemic vowels, contrasting in a feature Andy Eatough calls loose throat vs. tight throat.  Underlining is used as an ad-hoc symbol for tight throat; phonetically, these vowels are laryngealized and/or show a retracted tongue root.  Loose vs. tight throat is the only distinction in the two pairs of syllabic consonants, but in the vocoids it is reinforced by a height difference.

The syllabic consonants  are essentially the usual Sinological vowels , so  can be identified with the vowel of the Mandarin   "four", but they have diverse realizations.   completely assimilates to a preceding coronal except in voice, e.g.     "to marry", and are  after a labial nasal, e.g.     "cloth".   assimilates similarly after laterals, retaining its rounding, e.g.     "to stir-fry", and is  after a labial nasal, e.g.     "mushroom"; moreover it induces a labially trilled release of preceding labial or alveolar stops, e.g.     "to hit".

That it is phonemically loose-throat is shown by its behaviour in tightness harmony in compound words.

Nuosu syllable structure is (C)V.

Tones 
 high  /  – written 
 high-mid  /  or mid falling  /  – written  (written with diacritic ̑ over symbol in the syllabary)
 mid  /  – unmarked
 low falling  /  – written 

The high-mid tone is only marginally contrastive.  Its two main sources are from tone sandhi rules, as the outcome of a mid tone before another mid tone, and the outcome of a low-falling tone after a mid tone.  However, these changes do not occur in all compounds where they might: for instance   "bear" +   "mother" regularly forms   "female bear", but   "jackal" +   "mother" forms   "female jackal" without sandhi.  The syntax creates other contrasts: tone sandhi applies across the boundary between object and verb, so is present in SOV clauses like   "Mujy looks for Luti", but is absent in OSV clauses like   "Luti looks for Mujy".  A few words, like   "what?", have underlying high-mid tone.

Vocabulary and grammar
Nuosu is an analytic language, the basic word order is Subject–object–verb. Vocabularies of Nuosu can be divided into content words and function words. Among content words, nouns in Nuosu do not perform inflections for grammatical gender, number, and cases, classifiers are required when the noun is being counted; verbs do not perform conjugations for its persons and tenses; adjectives are usually placed after the word being fixed with a structural particle and do not perform inflections for comparison. Function words, especially grammatical particles, have a significant role in terms of sentence constructions in Nuosu. Nuosu does not have article words, but conjunctions and postposition words are used.

Numbers
Classifiers are required when numbers are used for fixing nouns.

References 

 Andy Eatough. 1997. Proceeding from Syllable Inventory to Phonemic Inventory in the Analysis of Liangshan Yi.  Work Papers of the Summer Institute of Linguistics, University of North Dakota session, volume 41.

Further reading 

 Collective book, Ritual for Expelling Ghosts, A religious Classic of the Yi nationality in Liangshan Prefecture, Sichuan. The Taipei Ricci Institute (November 1998) .
 Ma Linying, Dennis Elton Walters, Susan Gary Walters (editors). Nuosu Yi-Chinese-English Glossary. Nationalities Publishing House (2008). /H.638.
 
 Review of Bilingual education and minority language maintenance in China: The role of schools in saving the Yi language, by Lubei Zhang and Linda Tsung. Journal of  Linguistics  56: 450—454 (2020).

External links 

 Yi font by SIL
 Pronunciation of  Yi Consonant and Vowel
 Learn Yi Vocabulary
 Yi language edition of the People's Daily
 Yi keyboard input
 600 Phrases in the Liangshan Yi Dialect
 Large Chinese forum dedicated to speaking and studying Yi language

Loloish languages
Languages of China
Yi people
Languages attested from the 15th century
Liangshan Yi (Nuosu) is mostly spoken in southern Sichuan (mainly Liangshan). In places of Suchuan in which there are only Nuosu speakers, it is also simply referred to as Yi, and the other Sichuanese Yi language is [[Nasu.

Northern Yi (Nuosu) in northern Yunnan is spoken mainly in the northern part of Yunnan, including Kunming and Chuxiong. It is also called Black Yi or White Yi.

In Vietnam, Nuosu (usually known as Northern Lô Lô) is spoken in Ha Giang Province and Lao Cai Province, and speakers are classified as Lô Lô people. No known is about of the number of Nuosu in Vietnam.

In Laos, Nuosu is spoken in Phongsaly Province in 3 villages near the Chinese border. Speakers are classified separately as Lolo.

In Myanmar, Nuosu is possibly spoken in Shan State or Kachin State, and it is usually known as Northeastern Yi or simply Yi, and speakers are classified as Lisu people which form the Kachin people.

In Thailand, Nuosu (usually referred to as Lolo), is spoken in Chiang Rai Province. Speakers are classified as Lolo subgroup of Lisu people. The Lolo of Thailand migrated from Myanmar.